Thul is the town of Jacobabad District in the Sindh Province of Pakistan. It is located at 28°14'0N 68°46'0E at an altitude of 59 metres (196 feet). Thul is biggest Tehsil of Sindh; It 10 Police Stations, 3 Town Committees, 1 Civil Hospital and 5 rural Health centers, 3 High Schools, that are working. It has a degree college on Mir Pur Burriro road. Thul has the largest rice industry in the city of Sindh.

See also
 Thul Tehsil
 Jacobabad
 Jacobabad District

References

Jacobabad District